HMS Katoomba was a  built for the Royal Navy, originally named HMS Pandora, built by Armstrong Whitworth, Elswick, Tyne and Wear and launched on 27 August 1889. Renamed on 2 April 1890, as Katoomba as the flagship of the Auxiliary Squadron of the Australia Station. She arrived in Sydney with the squadron on 5 September 1891. She was damaged in a collision with the tug Yatala in Port Adelaide on 29 December 1891. She left the Australia Station on 16 January 1906. She was sold for £8500 on 10 July 1906 and broken up at Morecambe.

Notes

References

 

1889 ships
Ships built by Armstrong Whitworth
Ships built on the River Tyne
Pearl-class cruisers
Victorian-era cruisers of the United Kingdom